The World Association of Theoretical and Computational Chemists (WATOC) is a scholarly association founded in 1982 "in order to encourage the development and application of theoretical methods" in chemistry, particularly theoretical chemistry and computational chemistry. It was originally called the World Association of Theoretical Organic Chemists, but was later renamed the World Association of Theoretically Oriented Chemists, and in 2005 renamed once more to the World Association of Theoretical and Computational Chemists.

Conferences 
WATOC organizes a triennial world congress with over 1,000 participants in last years.

Awards 

The association awards two yearly medals: the Schrödinger Medal to "outstanding theoretical and computational chemist", and the Dirac Medal to "outstanding theoretical and computational chemist under the age of 40".

List of presidents 
Presidents of WATOC:

External links
WATOC home page

References 

Chemistry societies
Scientific organizations established in 1982